Death Sentence is a 2007 American vigilante action thriller film loosely based on the 1975 novel of the same name by Brian Garfield; although the novel is a sequel to Garfield's Death Wish, the film is unconnected to the previous Death Wish film series. Directed by James Wan, the film stars Kevin Bacon as Nick Hume, a man who takes the law into his own hands after his son is murdered by a gang member as an initiation ritual; Hume must then protect his family from the gang's resulting vengeance.

Death Sentence was released by 20th Century Fox on August 31, 2007, and was released on DVD on January 8, 2008. It was a box-office bomb earning $16 million against a $20 million budget, and received negative reviews from critics, who criticized the graphic violence and plot.

Plot
Nick Hume, a businessman living in Columbia, South Carolina, goes to watch his son Brendan's hockey game. As they are driving home, they stop at a gas station in a bad part of town. During an apparent robbery of the gas station, Joe Darley, a new gang member, slices Brendan's throat with a machete. Nick ambushes the thugs, pulls off Joe's mask and sees his face. Joe escapes, only to get hit by a car. Nick rushes Brendan to the hospital, but the boy dies. Lucas, Nick's younger and less charismatic son suffers survivor guilt.

Nick identifies Joe in a police line-up, but is outraged when the district attorney tells him that the defense will cut a deal for a light sentence, since there is not enough evidence to take the case to trial. At a pre-trial hearing, Nick recants his identification so Joe will go free. After following the gang to their hideout, Nick waits until Joe is alone and stabs him to death. The gang leader, Billy, wants revenge. One of the gang members says his sister saw a man in a suit on the night when Joe was killed. Confirming it was Nick from a newspaper picture, they ambush him on the street. He is chased to a parkade. He manages to stay hidden, and runs up the parkade levels, jumping on vehicles as he goes. The alarms from the cars are going off which seems to confuse Billy and his gang. Nick ends up on the top level where a gang member is closing in. Nick fights for his life, and ends up trapped in a car with the guy. As the gear shift is hit into "neutral" the car rolls to the edge of the parkade. Nick escapes just in time, but the gang member plummets to his death. Nick finds his own car and drives home. 
Another of the gang members arrives at Nick's office to deliver a suitcase he dropped during the chase. Nick calls a phone number found in the case, which belongs to Billy. Billy warns that Nick has bought a "death sentence" for his family, revealing that Joe was his brother. Nick immediately calls Jessica Wallis, the detective assigned to Brendan's case, who is already aware of what Nick started. Jessica grants Nick's family police protection and issues APBs on Billy and his gang. That night, the officers at Nick's house are stealthily killed, but by the time Nick realizes, he finds the gang members are in the house. They attack and subdue Nick, then drag Helen and Lucas downstairs to shoot them; Helen dies while Nick and Lucas are hospitalized.

After Jessica gives a speech that wars are never settled, Nick forces his way to the ward where Lucas is in a coma. Nick apologizes for not being a better father, then escapes through a hospital window to go after the remaining gang members, obtaining guns from a black market gun dealer named Bones, who, at the conclusion of their transaction, reveals himself as Billy's father. Nick tracks down Heco, a member of the gang, and interrogates him about where the other members are, learning their lair is an abandoned mental hospital that they call "The Office". He forces Heco at gunpoint to call Billy's cell phone, and executes him while Billy is listening. Bones confronts Billy, who kills him. Nick heads to "The Office" to wipe out the surviving gang. After a shootout, he and Billy encounter and seriously wound each other in the ex-hospital's chapel. Sitting on the same pew, Billy claims that he turned Nick into a vicious cold-blooded killer just like him. Nick pulls out his revolver and asks Billy if he's ready to meet his maker, as Billy sheds a tear before Nick ends his life. With his family now avenged, Nick returns home, watches his own family's movies and awaits his inevitable arrest. When she arrives, Jessica informs him that Lucas has improved and will now live.

Alternative ending
In the extended version of the film, Nick succumbs to his injuries.

Cast
 Kevin Bacon as Nick Hume
 Garrett Hedlund as Billy Darley
 Kelly Preston as Helen Hume
 Aisha Tyler as Detective Jessica Wallis
 John Goodman as Bones Darley
 Matt O'Leary as Joe Darley
 Leigh Whannell as Spink
 Stuart Lafferty as Brendan Hume
 Zachary Dylan Smith as Young Brendan Hume
 Jordan Garrett as Lucas Hume
 Edi Gathegi as Bodie
 Yorgo Constantine as Michael Behring
 Hector Atreyu Ruiz as Heco
 Kanin Howell as Baggy
 Judith Roberts as Judge Shaw

Production

Development
Brian Garfield, author of the original novel Death Wish and its sequel Death Sentence, was disappointed with the film adaption of Death Wish (1974) and the subsequent sequels. In 1980, he was hired by the Cannon Group, Inc. to write a film adaptation of Death Sentence to be helmed by the first film's director Michael Winner. However, Menahem Golan and Yoram Globus disliked the second novel and instead decided to purchase the rights to Garfield's characters rather than adapting the novel itself. They also purchased the rights to the first film from Dino De Laurentiis and Paramount Pictures. The subsequent film Death Wish II (1982) was strictly a sequel to the first film and bore no relation to Garfield's novel.

The film franchise has since gathered a cult following after the release of its third part, Death Wish 3 (1985). After James Wan had read Garfield's novels and seen all the film adaptions, he got an inspiration to make his film about the novels. Garfield was impressed after he was hired to make the first few drafts for the film to make the film what Garfield had imagined it to be. The rest of the chosen draft was written by Ian Mackenzie Jeffers.

Casting
Kevin Bacon was hired after James saw him as the perfect choice for the role of Nick Hume. Garrett Hedlund was chosen for the role of Billy Darley, the main leader of the gang. He was asked to shave his head and gain some weight, to which he agreed. He also watched a documentary about lions to portray Billy's animalistic nature. Aisha Tyler had been cast as the detective, Jessica Wallis. She was originally written as a 50-year-old male detective, but the choice was cancelled. Other cast members include John Goodman, Judith Roberts and Stuart Lafferty.

Filming
The film was shot in 2 months. The filming locations included, Columbia, South Carolina and Los Angeles, California.

Music
The music was composed by Charlie Clouser, who previously collaborated with Wan on Saw (2004) and Dead Silence (2007).

Incidental music includes several bars of "Hey Joe" by Jimi Hendrix, played while Nick is stalking Joe Darley.

Release

Box office
Death Sentence opened in 1,822 theaters in the United States and grossed $4,231,321, with an average of $2,322 per theater and ranking #8 at the box office. The film ultimately earned $9,534,258 domestically and $7,440,201 internationally for a total of $16,974,459.

Critical reception

Rotten Tomatoes, a review aggregator, reports that 20% of 113 surveyed critics gave the film a positive review; the average rating was 4.20/10. The critical consensus states: "A nonsensical plot and an absurd amount of violence make this revenge pic gratuitous and overwrought." The film has a score of 36 out of 100 on Metacritic based on 24 critics, indicating "Generally unfavorable reviews".

Roger Ebert of the Chicago Sun-Times gave the film  stars out of 4. He compared Death Sentence to the Death Wish films starring Charles Bronson, saying: "In the Bronson movies, the hero just looked more and more determined until you felt if you tapped his face, it would explode. In Death Sentence, Bacon acts out a lot more." Ebert called Death Sentence "very efficient", praising "a courtroom scene of true surprise and suspense, and some other effective moments", but concluded that "basically this is a movie about a lot of people shooting at each other".

Scott Tobias of The A.V. Club contends the film is "certainly never boring"; he felt that director James Wan was "too busy jamming the accelerator to realize that his movie's spinning out of control." Matt Zoller Seitz of The New York Times said, "Aside from a stunning three-minute tracking shot as the gang pursues Nick through a parking garage, and Mr. Bacon's hauntingly pale, dark-eyed visage, Mr. Wan's film is a tedious, pandering time-waster." Owen Gleiberman of Entertainment Weekly felt that "[t]he morality of revenge is barely at issue in a movie that pushes the plausibility of revenge right over a cliff." Conversely, Justin Chang of Variety called the film "well-made, often intensely gripping". Similarly, Bill Gibron of PopMatters felt the film was "a significant movie" and "a wonderfully tight little thriller". Darren Amner of Eye for Film also gave the film a positive review, praising Bacon's performance in particular: "[H]is portrayal is emotional, sympathetic and highly aggressive. As a father he is touching and as a stone-cold killing machine he is even more convincing."

Author Brian Garfield, who wrote the novel the film is loosely based on, said of the film: "While I could have done with a bit less blood-and-thunder, I think it's a stunningly good movie. In the details of its story it's quite different from the novel, but it's a movie, not a novel. In its cinematic way it connects with its audience and it makes the same point the book makes, and those are the things that count." He also liked that, like his novels, but unlike the Death Wish film series, it does not advocate vigilantism. Garfield further explained in an interview: "I think that, except for its ludicrous violence toward the end, the Death Sentence movie does depict its character's decline and the stupidity of vengeful vigilantism," adding, "As a story it made the point I wanted it to make."

References

External links

2007 films
2007 action thriller films
2007 crime thriller films
2007 crime drama films
2000s gang films
2007 thriller drama films
20th Century Fox films
2000s psychological drama films
Hyde Park Entertainment films
2007 action drama films
American crime drama films
American action thriller films
American gang films
American thriller drama films
Films scored by Charlie Clouser
Films about murderers
Films about dysfunctional families
Films based on American novels
Films based on crime novels
Films directed by James Wan
American neo-noir films
American vigilante films
American psychological drama films
American films about revenge
Films based on works by Brian Garfield
Death Wish (film series)
2000s vigilante films
Films shot in Los Angeles
Films shot in South Carolina
Films set in South Carolina
2000s English-language films
2000s American films